Cedarville Township is a civil township of Menominee County in the U.S. state of  Michigan. The population was 276 at the 2000 census. The township was established in 1863.

Communities
Cedar Forks was initially settled in 1850.  It had a post office from 1852 until 1883.
Cedar River is an unincorporated community in the township on M-35, roughly midway between Menominee to the southwest and Escanaba to the northeast. The ZIP Code for the community and surrounding area is 49887. Wells State Park is located just south of Cedar River. Cedar River began with the establishment of a sawmill here in 1854.

Geography
Much of the land in the township is part of the Escanaba State Forest.

Demographics
As of the census of 2000, there were 276 people, 138 households, and 89 families residing in the township.  The population density was 3.5 per square mile (1.3/km2).  There were 384 housing units at an average density of 4.9 per square mile (1.9/km2).  The racial makeup of the township was 97.10% White, 0.36% African American, 1.45% Native American, and 1.09% from two or more races.

There were 138 households, out of which 13.8% had children under the age of 18 living with them, 60.1% were married couples living together, 1.4% had a female householder with no husband present, and 34.8% were non-families. 31.9% of all households were made up of individuals, and 11.6% had someone living alone who was 65 years of age or older.  The average household size was 2.00 and the average family size was 2.48.

In the township the population was spread out, with 12.3% under the age of 18, 2.9% from 18 to 24, 19.6% from 25 to 44, 43.5% from 45 to 64, and 21.7% who were 65 years of age or older.  The median age was 52 years. For every 100 females, there were 130.0 males.  For every 100 females age 18 and over, there were 126.2 males.

The median income for a household in the township was $29,107, and the median income for a family was $32,000. Males had a median income of $37,083 versus $28,125 for females. The per capita income for the township was $18,279.  About 11.7% of families and 12.9% of the population were below the poverty line, including 25.7% of those under the age of eighteen and 3.3% of those 65 or over.

References

Notes

Sources

Townships in Menominee County, Michigan
Marinette micropolitan area
1863 establishments in Michigan
Townships in Michigan
Michigan populated places on Lake Michigan